Mirska (1909 – after 1913) was a Thoroughbred racehorse that won the 1909 Epsom Oaks. Raced only three times in her lifetime, her only win occurred in the Oaks. Despite being a daughter of two English Classic winners, Mirska was not favoured to win the Oaks and won the race at 33-1 odds against the Derby winner and favourite Tagalie. She made no impact as a broodmare in France.

Background
Mirska was bred by Douglas Baird. Mirska's sire St. Frusquin was an outstanding racehorse who won the 2000 Guineas and the Eclipse Stakes in 1896. As a stallion he was Leading sire in Great Britain and Ireland on two occasions and sired the Classic winners Rosedrop (1910  Epsom Oaks), Flair (1906 1000 Guineas) and Quintessence (1903 1000 Guineas). Mirska's dam, Musa, won the Oaks in 1899 for her owner Douglas Baird. After Baird's death in April 1909, Musa was bought by Jean Prat (c. 1848 – 1940), a French turfman, for 4,000 guineas. Musa and her nursing foal Mirska were sent to Prat's Lessard-
le-Chêne stud in Saint-Julien-le-Faucon, France in 1909. Mirska's half-brother Montmartin was a sire in France and her full-brother Feramorz was a sire in New Zealand. Mirska was a bay filly with a narrow white strip and four white socks. She was trained at Newmarket by Tom Jennings, Jr.

Racing career
Mirska ran only three times in her racing career. As a two-year-old she was twice third and her only known race as a three-year-old was the Oaks. She was retired from racing immediately after the Oaks.

1911: two-year-old season
Mirska was sent from France to Britain in 1911. Scratched from the Coventry Stakes in June, her first engagement was in the Clearwell Stakes run at Newmarket on 10 October. Though noted to be "attractively-bred" by the press, she was not looked on favorably by the racing public despite her excellent pedigree. Ridden by the French jockey Georges Stern, she finished third in the race behind J. B. Joel colt Absurd and Khedive III. She was again third in the Maiden 2-year-old race at the Second October meeting at Newmarket won by Tidal Wave. In November, she was scratched for her last engagement, the Rangemore Plate.

The 1912 Epsom Oaks
On 5 June at Epsom Racecourse Mirska, ridden by Joe Childs started a 33/1 outsider in a fourteen-runner field for the 134th running of the Oaks Stakes. The overwhelming favourite was Tagalie, who had won the 1000 Guineas and defeated male opposition to win the Epsom Derby. Racing on heavy ground Mirska overtook the weakening Tagalie in the straight and drew away to win by three lengths.

Retirement
Mirska was retired from racing immediately after her Oaks victory. She returned to Prat's stud in France and was covered by Rock Sand at the Haras de Villebon in 1913. There is no record of the Rock Sand foal racing or if Mirska was rebred.

Pedigree

References

1909 racehorse births
Racehorses bred in the United Kingdom
Racehorses trained in the United Kingdom
Thoroughbred family 20-c
Epsom Oaks winners